This article lists all the confirmed national football squads for the 2007 FIFA U-17 World Cup held in South Korea between 18 August and 9 September 2007. The final squads were to be submitted to FIFA at least 10 working days before the opening match of the competition. Each squad contains 21 players, which consists of 3 goalkeepers and 18 outfield players. Before announcing their final squads, teams were allowed to name a provisional squad of 23 to 35 players, which then had to be reduced to their final 21.  Players marked with (c) were named captains for their respective teams.

Players marked with bold are capped for senior national team at some stage in their career.

Group A

Head coach:  Manuel Ureña

Head coach:  Park Kyung-hoon

Head coach:  Juan José Oré

Head coach:  Paul Sauter

Group B

Head coach:  Lucho Nizzo

Head coach:  John Peacock

Head coach:  Kim Myong-chol

Head coach:  Colin Tuaa

Group C

Head coach:  Miguel Angel Tojo

Head coach:  Miguel Escalante

Head coach:  Juan Santisteban

Head coach:  Mohamad Aljomaa

Group D

Head coach:  François Blaquart

Head coach:  Jean Yves Labaze

Head coach:  Hiroshi Jofuku

Head coach:  Yemi Tella

Group E

Head Coach:  Bob Browaeys

Head Coach:  Pulod Kodirov

Head coach:  Maher Kanzari

Head Coach:  John Hackworth

Group F

Head coach:  Eduardo Lara

Head coach:  Heiko Herrlich

Head coach:  Sellas Tetteh

Head coach:  Anton Corneal

References

Fifa U-17 World Cup Squads, 2007
FIFA U-17 World Cup squads